Ingrid Pahlmann (born 1 December 1957) is a German politician of the Christian Democratic Union (CDU) who has served as a member of the Bundestag from the state of Lower Saxony from 2013 till 2017 and again from 2019 to 2021.

Political career 
Pahlmann became a member of the Bundestag again in 2019, representing the Gifhorn – Peine district. She is a member of the Committee for Family, Senior Citizens, Women and Youth.

Political positions 
In June 2017, Pahlmann voted against her parliamentary group’s majority and in favor of Germany's introduction of same-sex marriage.

References

External links 

  
 Bundestag biography 

1957 births
Living people
Members of the Bundestag for Lower Saxony
Female members of the Bundestag
21st-century German women politicians
Members of the Bundestag 2017–2021
Members of the Bundestag 2013–2017
Members of the Bundestag for the Christian Democratic Union of Germany